The State University of New York at Canton (SUNY Canton) is a public college in Canton, New York. It is part of the State University of New York. The college offers 31 bachelor's degrees, 20 associate degrees, three one-year certificate programs, and 23 online degrees.

History 

Founded in 1906 as the School of Agriculture (SOA) at St. Lawrence University, SUNY Canton was the first postsecondary, two-year college authorized by the New York State Legislature. In 1941, SOA was renamed the New York State Agricultural and Technical Institute (ATI). ATI became a member college of the State University of New York in 1948. To recognize advanced technology programs added in the 1950s and 1960s, the college underwent another name change in 1965, this time becoming the State University of New York Agricultural and Technical College at Canton (ATC). In 1987, the SUNY Board of Trustees authorized yet another name change to the college's present designation as the State University of New York College of Technology at Canton.

In 1997, SUNY Canton received bachelor's degree granting approval from the SUNY Board of Trustees and the Governor of New York State.

Academics 
Since SUNY Canton offers one-year certificates, associates degrees, and bachelor's degrees, students in many disciplines may pursue a "ladder curriculum", allowing them to first earn a certificate and then proceed to the next level. SUNY Canton confers degrees through three academic schools: the School of Business & Liberal Arts, the Canino School of Engineering Technology, and the School of Science, Health & Criminal Justice.

Special programs 
The university offers cross-registration with St. Lawrence University, Clarkson University, and SUNY Potsdam as members of the Associated Colleges of the St. Lawrence Valley. A two-and-two program in environmental science and forestry and a one-and-one program in Forest Technology are offered in conjunction with the State University of New York College of Environmental Science and Forestry. In both programs students begin taking general education classes at SUNY Canton prior to transferring to SUNY ESF to take environmental and forestry classes and complete the degree programs. Students interested in pursuing a master's degree in accountancy (MS), health services administration (MS), and technology management (MBA) have the opportunity to do so through agreements with Clarkson University. The college is also home to the David Sullivan-St. Lawrence County Law Enforcement Academy and the SUNY Canton Corrections Academy.

Accreditation
 Middle States Commission on Higher Education
 American Veterinary Medical Association
American Board of Funeral Service Education
American Dental Association Commission on Dental Accreditation
Commission on Accreditation in Physical Therapy Education
 Accreditation Board for Engineering and Technology
Accreditation Commission for Education in Nursing, Inc.
International Accreditation Council for Business Education
 National Automotive Technicians Education Foundation
Interstate Renewable Energy Council
 National Institute for Automotive Service Excellence

Campus 
Cook Hall is home to the School of Science, Health and Criminal Justice. The facility includes mortuary science facilities, science labs, and nursing facilities. In 2012, a fire damaged part of the Cook Hall. In 2003 the university opened the  Newell Veterinary Technology Center. The building houses SUNY Canton's veterinary science programs and includes veterinary labs, classroom and conference space. The SUNY Canton Canino School of Engineering and Technology is located inside the Nevaldine Technology Center In addition to the engineering technology and information technology programs, the facility also includes space for SUNY's automotive, powersports, building trades, heating and plumbing, and air conditioning programs.

MacArthur Hall, formerly known as the Faculty Office Building, is located near the center of campus and is connected to many of the other academic buildings on campus. It was named after President Emeritus Earl W. MacArthur The School of Business & Liberal Arts is located inside the building as well as many of the administrative offices. The building also includes one of the various on-campus dining options, a deli and coffee shop.

The Miller Campus Center is the heart of the SUNY campus. The $12 million center opened in 2002, replacing the Kingston Theatre which suffered extensive fire damage in 1997.
The Miller Campus Center contains student activity offices, conference spaces study and relaxation areas lounge space the SUNY Campus Bookstore, on-campus post office, Health Center, dining center, and a gym for student recreational and intramural activities.

Southworth Library is the academic library for SUNY Canton. It houses college archives, a coffee shop known as the Cyber Cafe, the university's print and digital media collections for use by students for research and recreation. The collection includes over 65,000 volumes, 300 periodical subscriptions and 1,500 video and audio recordings. Students also have access to over 25 electronic information research databases.

Residence life 
SUNY Canton currently has five residence halls: Kennedy, Heritage, Mohawk, Rushton, and Smith. They are located along the Grasse River in the north-central portion of the campus. Kennedy Hall is a housing option offering apartment-style living for upper classmen. Features include a multi-purpose classroom and meeting space, and a large open courtyard for recreation and outdoor activities. Chaney Dining Center is the main dining hall on the campus; it is located near the residence halls and serves both resident and commuter students.

Athletics 
The SUNY Canton athletic teams are called the Kangaroos (often shortened to Roos). The university is a member of the NCAA Division III ranks, primarily competing in the North Atlantic Conference (NAC) since 2018–19 the academic year. The Kangaroos previously competed in the D-III American Collegiate Athletic Association (ACAA) during the 2017–18 academic year; as an NCAA D-III Independent from 2011–12 to 2016–17; and the Sunrise Conference of the National Association of Intercollegiate Athletics (NAIA) from 2004–05 to 2010–11.

SUNY Canton competes in 17 intercollegiate varsity sports: Men's sports include baseball, basketball, cross country, golf, ice hockey, lacrosse and soccer; while women's sports include basketball, cross country, golf, ice hockey, lacrosse, soccer, softball and volleyball; and co-ed sports include cheerleading and eSports.

History
SUNY Canton was a member of the NAIA from 2004 to 2011 after transitioning from the National Junior College Athletic Association (NJCAA) as the school moved from a two-year community college to four-year comprehensive university.

In June 2015, the college was approved for full membership status in the NCAA Division III.

Athletics expansion 
The university announced an expansion of athletics starting in the 2011–12 academic year. In 2011, SUNY Canton added men's golf and men's and women's lacrosse, in addition to reinstating its women's volleyball program. The university added women's ice hockey in the 2012–13 academic year and the team has played in the Northeast Women's Hockey League (NEWHL) conference since the 2019–20 season. SUNY Canton also added a women's golf team in 2015.

In 2018 SUNY Canton announced it will begin competing nationally in coed Esports. The college became the first New York State team to join the National Association of Collegiate Esports (NACE) and the first varsity esports program in the State University of New York system. Esports teams currently play competitively in the Eastern College Athletic Conference (ECAC). The Overwatch and FIFA teams captured ECAC championship titles in 2018.

In 2019, SUNY Canton Athletics announced the addition of varsity cheerleading.

Men's ice hockey 
The SUNY Canton ice hockey program began in the mid-1960s and has won 15 NJCAA National Championships in: 1973, 1974, 1975, 1976, 1978, 1979, 1981, 1982, 1983, 1987, 1989, 1992, 1996, 1997, and 2000. The team currently competes in the Division III (NCAA) level as it was awarded independent status with eventual admittance into the SUNY conference. In its second season as a member of the ACHA, the Roos reached the 2010 ACHA Division I National Tournament before falling to Penn State 3–7 in the first round. The Roos won their second straight ECHL regular season championship and first ever conference playoff championship in 2011. The team also made a second straight appearance in the ACHA DI Championship.

As of 2020 the team still competes as a NCAA D-III Independent, mostly because of SUNY Potsdam and SUNY Plattsburgh refusing the admission of the team in the State University of New York Athletic Conference (SUNYAC) due to regional concerns.

Athletic facilities 
The school completed a new Convocation, Athletic and Recreation Center, otherwise known as "CARC" and nicknamed "Roos House" in 2011. The facility features several athletic courts, an ice arena, a pool and a fitness center, along with office and student spaces.

Student life

Clubs and organizations
Students participate in several clubs and organizations under the umbrella of the student government known as the Student Government Association (SGA) with staff support from the Student Activities office. Intramural and recreational activities are also available.SUNY Canton does not have a community college newspaper, but the SGA  is operated by the Office of the President.

References

External links 

Official website
Official athletics website

 
Universities and colleges in St. Lawrence County, New York
Public universities and colleges in New York (state)
Educational institutions established in 1906
1906 establishments in New York (state)